The 2021 Unibet Premier League Darts was a darts tournament organised by the Professional Darts Corporation and the seventeenth edition of the tournament. The event was scheduled to begin on Thursday 4 February at the Motorpoint Arena in Cardiff and end with the play-offs at the Mercedes-Benz Arena in Berlin on Thursday 27 May, but due to the continuation of the COVID-19 outbreak, was delayed to begin with the first nine rounds taking place from 5 April behind closed doors at the Marshall Arena, Milton Keynes. On 22 March 2021, it was then confirmed that all the fixtures would take place in Milton Keynes, with the playoffs taking place on Friday 28 May; up to 1,000 people were allowed to attend from Monday 24 May.

Glen Durrant was the reigning champion, having beaten Nathan Aspinall 11–8 in the 2020 final, but a run of seven successive defeats saw him eliminated on night seven; Durrant eventually became the first player in Premier League Darts history to fail to score a single point. Rob Cross was also eliminated from the competition for a second consecutive year on the eighth night, despite earning seven points, which is the most by an eliminated player since elimination came into effect in 2013.

Two nine-dart finishes were thrown during the tournament. Jonny Clayton threw a nine-darter against José de Sousa on Night Three, and the very next day, de Sousa threw a nine-darter of his own against Nathan Aspinall. He also hit 11 maximum scores of 180 during the match, equalling the Premier League record set by Gary Anderson in 2011. De Sousa threw 96 maximums during the tournament, surpassing Gary Anderson's record of 79.

For the first time, the playoffs featured four players from four nations: Michael van Gerwen from the Netherlands, Jose de Sousa from Portugal, Nathan Aspinall from England, and Jonny Clayton from Wales.

Jonny Clayton won his second individual televised title, defeating fellow debutant José de Sousa 11–5 in the final. He became the first Welshman to win the event, the first champion to have finished fourth in the league phase, and the first person to defeat Michael van Gerwen in a Premier League semi-final.

Format
The tournament format reverted to that used in 2018, with a permanent list of ten players, instead of nine players and a guest "challenger" each week, as had been used in 2019 & 2020.

Phase 1:
In each round, the ten players play each other in five matches. Phase 1 matches have a maximum of twelve legs, allowing for the winner being first to seven or a six-six draw. At the end of Phase 1, the bottom two players are eliminated from the competition.

Phase 2:
In each round, the remaining eight players play each other in four matches. Phase 2 matches have a maximum of fourteen legs, allowing for the winner being first to eight or a seven-seven draw. At the end of Phase 2, the bottom four players in the league table are eliminated from the competition.

Play-off Night:
The top four players in the league table contest the two knockout semi-finals with 1st playing 4th and 2nd playing 3rd. The semi-finals are first to 10 legs (best of 19). The two winning semi-finalists meet in the final which is first to 11 legs (best of 21).

Venues

The announced calendar included The Brighton Centre being restored to the calendar, having last hosted the Premier League in 2017. The initial calendar also restored rounds in Birmingham, Belfast, Leeds, Berlin, Rotterdam, Glasgow, Manchester, Newcastle, Sheffield and London; all of which had been scheduled for 2020 but cancelled due to the COVID-19 pandemic; with Berlin replacing London as the scheduled host of the final. Milton Keynes and Coventry, which hosted rounds in 2020 following the pandemic, were not intended to be on the 2021 calendar. Due to the continuation of the pandemic, the PDC confirmed that the first nine rounds would be held over two weeks at the Marshall Arena, Milton Keynes. On 22 March 2021, it was confirmed that all the remaining dates, including the playoffs, would also be played in Milton Keynes.

The first five nights took place from Monday 5 April to Friday 9 April, with the next four nights, including Judgement Night (where the bottom two players are eliminated), taking place from Monday 19 April to Thursday 22 April. The second half will again be in two parts with the first part taking place between Wednesday 5 May to Friday 7 May, and the second part to take place from Monday 24 May to Thursday 27 May, with the playoffs taking place on Friday 28 May.

Prize money
The prize money for the 2021 tournament was increased from £825,000 to £855,000, due to the additional player compared to 2020.

Players
Nine of the ten players in this year's tournament were announced following the 2021 PDC World Darts Championship on 3 January. The top four on the PDC Order of Merit are joined by six wildcards. The tenth was announced following the 2021 Masters, with the final of that event serving effectively as a play-off between Mervyn King and Jonny Clayton, with the winner qualifying.

Gerwyn Price, the world number one and reigning world champion, tested positive for COVID-19 before the start of the tournament and had to withdraw. James Wade, the highest-ranked player not in the tournament, was brought in as a replacement.

League stage

5 April – Night 1 (Phase 1)

6 April – Night 2 (Phase 1)

7 April – Night 3 (Phase 1)

8 April – Night 4 (Phase 1)

9 April – Night 5 (Phase 1)

19 April – Night 6 (Phase 1)

20 April – Night 7 (Phase 1)

21 April – Night 8 (Phase 1)

{| class=wikitable style="text-align:center"
|-
!width=225|
!width=50|Score
!width=225|
|- align=left
|align=right|  ||align=center| 5 – 7 || 
|- align=left
|align=right|  ||align=center| 7 – 3 || 
|- align=left
|align=right|  ||align=center| 7 – 2 || 
|- align=left
|align=right|  ||align=center| 6 – 6 || 
|- align=left
|align=right|  ||align=center| 6 – 6 || 
|- align=center
|colspan="3" | Night's Average: 95.58
|- align=center
|colspan="3" | Highest Checkout:  160|- align=center
|colspan="3" | Most 180s:  and  7|- align=center
|colspan="3" | Night's 180s: 36 
|}

5 May – Night 10 (Phase 2)

6 May – Night 11 (Phase 2)

7 May – Night 12 (Phase 2)

24 May – Night 13 (Phase 2)

25 May – Night 14 (Phase 2)

26 May – Night 15 (Phase 2)

27 May – Night 16 (Phase 2)

Play-offs – 28 May
 Marshall Arena, Milton Keynes'''

Table and streaks

Table
After the first nine rounds in phase 1, the bottom two players in the table are eliminated. In phase 2, the eight remaining players play in a single match on each of the seven nights. The top four players then compete in the knockout semi-finals and final on the playoff night.

Two points are awarded for a win and one point for a draw. When players are tied on points, leg difference is used first as a tie-breaker, after that legs won against throw and then tournament average.

Streaks

Positions by Week

References

External links
 PDC Professional Darts Corporation, official website
 PDC Professional Darts Corporation, official website, Tournaments

2021
2021 in darts
Sports events postponed due to the COVID-19 pandemic
2021 in British sport